Glunder is a surname. Notable people with the surname include:

Massaro Glunder (born 1994), Dutch kickboxer
Rodney Glunder (born 1975), Dutch-Surinamese martial artist